On May 20, 1958 a Vickers Viscount airliner operating Capital Airlines Flight 300 was involved in a mid-air collision with a United States Air Force T-33 jet trainer on a proficiency flight in the skies above Brunswick, Maryland. All 11 people on board the Viscount and one of the two crew in the T-33 were killed in the accident.

Flight 300 was the second of four fatal crashes in under two years involving Capital Airlines Viscounts; the others were Flight 67 (April 1958), Flight 75 (May 1959), and Flight 20 (January 1960).

An investigation of the accident concluded that the pilot in command of the T-33 failed to see and maintain a safe distance from other air traffic.

Accident
Capital Airlines Flight 300 was a regular scheduled flight from Chicago, Illinois to Baltimore, Maryland with an intermediate stop at Pittsburgh,  Pennsylvania. The flight from Chicago was uneventful and at 10:50 local time the airliner departed Pittsburgh bound for Baltimore. At 11:25 while cruising  at  Washington Air Traffic Control cleared Flight 300 to descend and maintain . This was the last radio transmission from the Viscount.
      
The T-33 jet trainer launched from Martin State Airport at 11:07 for a VFR familiarization flight; its air speed was significantly higher as it approached the Viscount from the left and behind. While slowly climbing through  at 85 percent engine power, the jet banked slightly to the right and impacted the left side of the airliner forward of the wing. The airliner pitched up, its air speed decreasing, then the nose dropped and the aircraft entered a steep spin to the right, slowing to a flat spin before it struck the ground. The T-33 pilot was thrown clear of the flaming jet and parachuted safely to the ground but was badly burned. The jet disintegrated after the collision and the passenger was fatally injured.

Aircraft and crew

Vickers aircraft and crew 
The four engine Viscount V.745 British medium-range turboprop airliner, serial number 108, first flew from Hampshire, England on 6 January, 1956. Powered by Rolls-Royce Dart RDa3 Mark 506 engines turning four blade square tipped constant-speed propellers, it was delivered to Capital Airlines on 15 January, 1956 as fleet number 329.

The pilot in command of Flight 300 was Captain Kendall Brady, age 38. He had a valid airman certificate and was rated to fly single/multi-engine land aircraft, as well as the Douglas DC-3, DC-4, and the Vickers Viscount. Hired by Capital Airlines on 11 June 1945, Brady's total flying hours were 12,719 with 1,432 of those in the Viscount.

Paul Meyer, age 26, served as co-pilot and started flying for Capital Airlines on 25 May 1956. He was certified to operate single/multi-engine land aircraft and had an instrument rating. Meyer's total flight hours were 2,467, of which 1,596 were in the Viscount.

T-33 aircraft and crew 
The two-place Lockheed T-33A Shooting Star subsonic American jet trainer aircraft involved was manufacture serial number 580-9528 and registered 53-5966. It was maintained by the Maryland Air National Guard and equipped with an Allison J33-A-35 turbojet engine.

The pilot and sole survivor of the accident was Captain Julius  McCoy, age 34. He was rated as a military pilot 4 August 1944 and joined the Maryland Air National Guard in 1952. He had a total of 1,902 hours in single- and multi-engine and single-engine jet aircraft 210 were in the T-33.

The other occupant of the aircraft was a member of the ground crew.

Investigation

The Civil Aeronautics Board (CAB) investigated the accident and released a report on January 9, 1959. It determined that the collision happened during VFR conditions, and that both aircraft would have been in clear cloud free air nine-tenths of the time. The report noted that it is the overtaking aircraft's responsibility to see and avoid a collision. A contributing factor in the accident was that the small size of the T-33 made it difficult to pick up on radar.

The board attributed no blame to the Viscount crew and stated in conclusion that "The Board determines the probable cause of this accident was the failure of the T-33 pilot to exercise a proper and adequate vigilance to see and avoid other traffic."

See also
Eastern Air Lines Flight 45
1958 in aviation
List of accidents and incidents on commercial aircraft

Notes

Footnotes

References

Accidents and incidents involving United States Air Force aircraft
Accidents and incidents involving the Vickers Viscount
Mid-air collisions involving airliners
Aviation accidents and incidents in the United States in 1958
Mid-air collisions
Mid-air collisions involving military aircraft
May 1958 events in the United States
1958 in Maryland